Zhou Yutong (born September 21, 1994)  is a Chinese actress.

Biography 
In 2013, Zhou made her acting debut in the children's fantasy film Balala the Fairies: the Movie.

In 2015, Zhou gained recognition for her role as a cold assassin in the fantasy romance drama Love Weaves Through a Millennium. The same year, she made her big screen debut in the youth film comedy 20 Once Again as a rock musician. 
In 2016, Zhou had her first leading role in the fantasy web drama The Journey.

In 2017, Zhou gained increased recognition with her role as a top actress in the fantasy action web drama Cambrian Period. The same year she starred in the fantasy romance drama Long For You, adapted from the comic "The Distance of Light Between You and Me".

In 2018, Zhou played a mermaid in the fantasy romance web series My Love From the Ocean.

In 2019, Zhou starred in the youth action drama Young Blood.

Filmography

Film

Television series

Awards and nominations

References 

1994 births
Living people
Actresses from Anhui
21st-century Chinese actresses
Chinese film actresses
Chinese television actresses